Gillet de La Tessonerie (c. 1620 – c. 1660) was a French playwright. Little of his life is known, though he is known to have been a member of the council of the Cour des Monnaies in 1642 and to have written nine plays between 1640 and 1657.

Selected works
L'Art de Régner (The Art of Reigning) (1645) - a tragi-comedy, each of whose five acts forms a separate playlet

External links

1620 births
1660 deaths
17th-century French dramatists and playwrights
17th-century French male writers